Adria (minor planet designation: 143 Adria) is a fairly large main-belt asteroid that was discovered by Austrian astronomer Johann Palisa on 23 February 1875, at the Austrian Naval Observatory, and named after the Adriatic Sea, on the coast of which the discovery was made. This dark-coloured asteroid has probably a primitive carbonaceous chondritic composition.

One occultation by Adria has been reported so far, from Japan on August 21, 2000. A somewhat spherical shape measuring 98 × 86 km was observed.

Photometric observations of this asteroid made during 2008 at the Organ Mesa Observatory in Las Cruces, New Mexico gave an irregular light curve with a period of 22.005 ± 0.001 hours and a brightness variation of 0.08 ± 0.01 in magnitude.

References

External links 
 Lightcurve plot of 143 Adria, Palmer Divide Observatory, B. D. Warner (2006)
 Asteroid Lightcurve Database (LCDB), query form (info )
 Dictionary of Minor Planet Names, Google books
 Asteroids and comets rotation curves, CdR – Observatoire de Genève, Raoul Behrend
 Discovery Circumstances: Numbered Minor Planets (1)-(5000) – Minor Planet Center
 
 

000143
Discoveries by Johann Palisa
Named minor planets
000143
000143
000143
18750223